The Archdiocesan Shrine of Santo Niño, also known as the Santo Niño Church, is a Roman Catholic church in Tacloban, Philippines.

History
The Santo Niño Parish Church was founded in 1770 by the Augustinian. Its namesake, the Santo Niño would be attributed to the end of a cholera epidemic in 1889. The arrival of the image of the child Jesus Christ in the Port of Tacloban, which was previously believed to be lost at sea, on June 30, 1889, was credited to have caused a miracle ending the outbreak.

On November 1, 2021, amidst the COVID-19 pandemic, the church was elevated to an archdiocesan shrine from a parish.

References

Buildings and structures in Tacloban
Roman Catholic shrines in the Philippines